The Keith-Albee-Orpheum Corporation was the owner of a chain of vaudeville and motion picture theatres. It was formed by the merger of the holdings of Benjamin Franklin Keith and Edward Franklin Albee II and Martin Beck's Orpheum Circuit.

History 
The company was incorporated in Delaware on January 28, 1928, to acquire the stocks of the B.F. Keith Corporation; Orpheum Circuit, Inc.; Vaudeville Collection Agency; B.F. Keith-Albee Vaudeville Exchange; and Greater New York Corporation. The company operated a chain of vaudeville and motion picture theatres in the United States and Canada with a seating capacity of 1,500,000 persons. The combined theater chain then had over 700 theaters in the United States and Canada. A total of 15,000 vaudeville performers were booked through the new entity. 

In May 1928, a controlling portion of stock was sold to Joseph P. Kennedy, from whom it was purchased in October by the Radio Corporation of America (RCA) as part of the deal, along with Film Booking Offices of America (FBO), that created the major motion picture studio Radio Keith Orpheum (RKO Pictures). 

After the establishment of RKO, motion pictures became the primary focus of entertainment at the former KAO theaters. Vaudeville survived only as an interlude for feature films.

Theaters 
 Keith-Albee Theatre, Huntington, West Virginia
 Keith-Albee Theater, Washington, D.C.
 Keith-Albee Theatre, Flushing, Queens

References 

Vaudeville theaters
1928 establishments in Delaware
American companies established in 1928
American companies disestablished in 1928
1928 mergers and acquisitions
Former cinemas in the United States
Movie theatre chains in the United States
Entertainment companies established in 1928
Entertainment companies disestablished in 1928
1928 disestablishments in Delaware
RKO General
Defunct companies based in Delaware